Natalia Borisovna Lebedeva (born 16 December 1964) is a Ukrainian former competitive figure skater who represented the Soviet Union. She is a two-time (1989 and 1990) European silver medalist, the 1988 Skate Canada International champion, and the 1990 Soviet national champion.

Her coaches included Vladimir Kovalev, Eduard Pliner, Igor Ksenofontov, Marina Obodyannikova, and Boris Rogashkin.

Results

References

Navigation

Soviet female single skaters
1964 births
Living people
Sportspeople from Zaporizhzhia
European Figure Skating Championships medalists
Universiade medalists in figure skating
Universiade silver medalists for the Soviet Union
Competitors at the 1983 Winter Universiade
Competitors at the 1990 Goodwill Games